The James Monroe Building is an office building located in Downtown Richmond, Virginia. Only 25 of the floors, however, are actually occupiable as the top and middle two are maintenance floors. Although it is the tallest building in Richmond, its location at the bottom of a hill gives it the appearance of being roughly the same height as other buildings in the Richmond skyline. The building has a parking garage at its base and is located adjacent to Interstate 95.

Completed in 1981, the James Monroe Building was intended to have a twin tower at the North end of its parking garage but the recession of the early 1980s ended the project. It was the tallest building in Virginia from 1981 to 2007 when it was surpassed by The Westin Virginia Beach Town Center & Residences in Virginia Beach.

References

Office buildings completed in 1981
Skyscrapers in Richmond, Virginia
Skyscraper office buildings in Virginia